"Future People" is a song performed by American rock band Alabama Shakes, issued as the third single from the band's second studio album Sound & Color. Co-produced by the band and co-written by lead singer Brittany Howard, the song has reached #37 on the Billboard rock chart.

Critical reception
"Future People" has received positive reviews from critics. Alicia Kort of Music Times complimented lead singer Brittany Howard's falsetto on the track and used it as an example on how the parent album blended different styles via the music. Kitty Empire of The Observer echoed this opinion while also complimenting the song's "sultry soul-rock groove".

Music video
The music video for "Future People" was released on August 10, 2015. Directed by Danny Clinch, the video shows the band performing the song live at Capitol Studio A in Hollywood. Alternatively, a video featuring the song's audio became available in March 2015.

Chart positions

References

External links
 
 

2015 songs
2015 singles
Alabama Shakes songs
ATO Records singles
MapleMusic Recordings singles
Rough Trade Records singles
Song recordings produced by Brittany Howard
Song recordings produced by Blake Mills
Songs written by Brittany Howard
Songs written by Blake Mills